Cameron Crombie (born 14 February 1986) is an Australian Para-Athlete who specialises in the shot put and javelin throw events. At his first major international competition, he won the gold medal in the Men's Shot Put F38 classification at the 2017 World Para Athletics Championships in London. England.

Personal
Crombie is the eldest of twin boys and was born on 14 February 1986 in Newcastle, New South Wales. He has hemiplegia (left side) because of a stroke during premature birth. His family managed to keep this from him until his diagnosis was revealed when he was 16 years of age.

Crombie completed a bachelor's degree in Economics at University of Newcastle, and moved to Canberra where he now lives. While pursuing a sporting career, he works full-time as a Project Manager and company Director, and a has been a volunteer firefighter with the Molonglo Brigade of the ACT Rural Fire Service since 2013.

Sport
Prior to taking up athletics, Crombie was involved with basketball from a young age and came up through the Junior representative levels with the Newcastle Hunters and eventually went on to play at a state level as a 16 year old.

In 2015, Crombie was introduced to para-sport, and became a National para-rowing champion by winning the men's single scull, mixed double scull (with Kathleen Murdoch) and the mixed coxed four in the LTA category, and was provisionally selected to represent Australia in the 2015 World Rowing Championships. Unfortunately, ongoing debate around classification and eligibility within rowing meant he did not compete.

Athletics
In 2015 Crombie transferred to para-athletics where he was immediately internationally classified as F38 (re-confirmed in 2019).  He is coached by Paralympic gold medalist Hamish MacDonald and continues to train in Canberra.

In his first major international para-athletics competition, he won the gold medal in the F38 Men's Shot Put with a world record throw of 15.95 m to smash the previous record mark by 37 cm. He also competed in the F38 Men's Javelin Throw, where he finished in 5th place with a throw that increased his personal best by over 3.5m.

Crombie represented his country for a second time, competing at the 2018 Commonwealth Games on the Gold Coast, Australia. Here he competed in the F38 Men's Shot put alongside fellow Australians Martin Jackson and Jayden Sawyer. Crombie finished with a best throw of 15.74m, ahead of Jackson, who took the silver medal with 13.74m.

In May 2019, Crombie, Sawyer and fellow athletes James Turner and Deon Kenzie were selected to represent Australia at the upcoming 2019 World Para Athletics Championships to be held in Dubai, United Arab Emirates, with the remainder of the team to be named in September, 2019.

At the 2019 World Para Athletics Championships in Dubai, he repeated his success at the 2017 Championships by winning the gold medal in the Men's Shot Put F38 with a throw of 15.73m.

Achievements

Recognition
 2017 Canberra Sport Awards - The People's Sporting Champion.
 2017-18 Athletics ACT - Male Senior Athlete of the Year
 2017-18 Athletics ACT - Para Athlete of the Year
 2019-20 Athletics ACT - Male Senior Athlete of the Year

References

External links
 
 
 Cameron Crombie at Athletics Australia (archive)
 Cameron Crombie at Australian Athletics Historical Results
 
 Cameron Crombie at Ray White Canberra

1986 births
Living people
Australian male athletes
Paralympic athletes of Australia
Commonwealth Games gold medallists for Australia
Commonwealth Games medallists in athletics
Athletes (track and field) at the 2018 Commonwealth Games
Cerebral Palsy category Paralympic competitors
Sportsmen from the Australian Capital Territory
Medallists at the 2018 Commonwealth Games